This is a list of the chairmen of Cardiganshire County Council.

1889-1914
1889—1890: Peter Jones, Aberystwyth
1890—1891: 
1891—1892: Levi James, Cardigan
1892—1893: Morgan Evans, Llanarth
1893—1894: D.C. Roberts, Aberystwyth
1894—1895: Rev. John Williams, Cardigan
1895—1896: John Morgan Howell, Aberaeron
1896—1897: C.M. Williams, Aberystwyth
1897—1898: Dr David Lloyd, Aberbanc, Newcastle Emlyn
1898—1899: John Charles Harford, Falcondale, Lampeter
1899—1900: Rev T. Mason Jones, Ysbyty Ystwyth
1900—1901: Matthew Vaughan-Davies MP
1901—1902: Colonel J.R. Howell
1902—1903: Dr Jenkyn Lewis, Llanon
1903—1904: Robert Ellis, Aberystwyth
1904—1905: Thomas Evans, Cefncourt, Llangrannog
1905—1906: D.J. Williams, Tregaron
1906—1907: E. Lima Jones, Aberaeron
1907—1908: H.C. Fryer, Aberystwyth
1908—1909: O. Beynon Evans, Cardigan
1909—1910: Rev William Griffiths, Maenygroes
1910—1911: R.S. Rowland, The Garth, Llanddewi
1911—1912:
1912—1913:
1913—1914:

References

Members of Cardiganshire County Council
Councillors in Wales